Wyanbene is a geographic area between Braidwood and Cooma in Southern New South Wales, Australia. It includes a significant cave system and is adjacent to Deua National Park.  The cave is at 35°47'42.25"S 149°40'56.48"E, at about 850 m altitude. A sheep and cattle farming area, there is still a lot of wildlife including wombats, greater gliders, wedge-tailed eagle, echidna, eastern grey kangaroo, wallabies, red-bellied black snakes, tiger snake, and Cunningham's spiny-tailed skink. There are also platypus and native fish in the Wyanbene Creek and nearby Shoalhaven and Deua rivers.

References
 http://fieldguides.eol.org/fieldguide-view.php?guidekey=263 field guide for fauna for the area 
 http://fieldguides.eol.org/fieldguide-view.php?guidekey=264 field guides for flora

Localities in New South Wales
Caves of New South Wales